The Communication, Transport and General Workers Union is a trade union in Trinidad and Tobago with most of its members in the former airline of BWIA.

See also

 List of trade unions

Transport trade unions in Trinidad and Tobago
Trade unions in the Caribbean
Aviation in the Caribbean
Aviation trade unions